Sir Robert Keith Arbuthnot, 2nd Baronet  (9 September 1801 – 4 March 1873) was a Scottish civil servant who served as Secretary to the Board of Trustees and Manufactures.

The son of Sir William Arbuthnot, 1st Baronet and Anne Alves entered the Bombay Civil Service and remained with them from 1819 to 1838. Arbuthnot succeeded to his father's baronetcy on 18 September 1829. A collector and Magistrate of Ahmedabad, India, he died, aged 71, in Florence, Italy.

Family
On 20 March 1828, he married Anne Fitzgerald, daughter of Field Marshal Sir John Forster FitzGerald. They had seven children:

Major Sir William Wedderburn Arbuthnot, 3rd Baronet (1831–1889)
Forster Fitzgerald Arbuthnot (1833–1901)
Reverend Robert Keith Arbuthnot (1838–1894), married Mary Agnes Vaughan, daughter of Reverend Canon Edward T. Vaughan on 17 June 1868
Henrietta Anne Arbuthnot (1840–1897)
John Alves Henry Arbuthnot (1842–1903)
FitzGerald Hay Arbuthnot (1849–1894)
Charlotte d'Ende Arbuthnot (died 1904), married Reverend Charles Hall Raikes on 21 April 1863

References

External links

1801 births
1873 deaths
Robert Keith Arbuthnot, Sir, 2nd Baronet
Baronets in the Baronetage of the United Kingdom
19th-century Scottish people
Fellows of the Royal Society of Edinburgh
Scottish knights
Scottish colonial officials
Scottish expatriates in Italy